Yousef Rashed Khamees Aboloya  is a Saudi football forward who played for Saudi Arabia in the 1984 Asian Cup.

References
Stats

Living people
Saudi Arabia international footballers
Saudi Arabian footballers
1984 AFC Asian Cup players
AFC Asian Cup-winning players
Al Nassr FC players
Saudi Professional League players
Association football forwards
1961 births